François-Isidore Darquier (1770–1812) was a French soldier in the Revolutionary Wars. He fought and died in the Peninsular War, and was ennobled by Napoleon for doing so.

References

French soldiers
People of the Peninsular War
1770 births
1812 deaths